TATA box binding protein (TBP)-associated factor, RNA polymerase I, D, 41kDa is a protein that in humans is encoded by the TAF1D gene.

Function 

TAF1D is a member of the SL1 complex, which includes TBP and TAF1A, TAF1B, and TAF1C, and plays a role in RNA polymerase I transcription.

References